Mo' Ritmo is the first album by the Ecuadorian singer Gerardo. Released in 1991 by Interscope Records as the label's inaugural album,
it peaked at No. 36 on the Billboard 200.

Production
The album was partially produced by Michael Sembello, who had worked on the "Rico Suave" single.

Critical reception
Entertainment Weekly wrote that Gerardo's "heavy use of Latin rhythms and melodies may give the music a twist, but Spanglish rap is delivered with more finesse by Mellow Man Ace and Kid Frost." Rolling Stone deemed Mo' Ritmo "a Latin-tinged debut album of bilingual just-a-gigolo raps." The Baltimore Sun wrote that "instead of simply sampling some Santana, Gerardo builds his beat around conga and timbale for a hard-core Latin hip-hop groove that makes 'Brother to Brother' and 'Rico Suave' kick like nothing else in rap."

Track listing
"When the Lights Go Out" (Gerardo Mejía, Dan Sembello, Michael Sembello) – 4:05
"Brother to Brother" (Mejía, Alfred Rubalcava) – 3:33
"Rico Suave" (Mejia, Christian Warren, Alberto Slezynger, Rosa Soy, Charles Bobbit) - 4:51
"En Mi Barrio" (Mejia, M. Sembello) - 2:58
"Latin Till I Die (Oye Como Va)" (cover; Mejia, Tito Puente) - 4:01
"We Want the Funk" (cover; written by Mejia, George Clinton, Bootsy Collins and Jerome Brailey) - 4:12
"Christina" (Mejia, Warren) - 3:56
"Fandango" (Mejia, Rubalcava) - 5:30
"You Gotta Hold of My Soul" (Mejia, M. Sembello) - 4:58
"The Groove Remains the Same" (Mejia, M. Sembello, Brian O'Doherty) - 5:13
”When the Lights Go Out [Dr. Freeze Mix]” (Mejia, D. Sembello, M. Sembello) - 3:20

Credits
Lead vocals: Gerardo
Additional vocals: Coco, Ellis Hall, Nikki Harris, Anna Marie, Gerardo, Xavier Menia, Brian O’Daughtery, Alfred Rubalcava, Cruz Baca Sembello, and Michael Sembello
Programmers: Jimmy Abney, Hilary Bercovici, Brian O’Daughtery, Alfred Rubalcava, Danny Sembello, Michael Sembello, and Christian Warren
Engineer: Hilary Bercovici, David Bianco, Bobby Brooks, Bud Rizzo, and Michael Smith
Assistant engineer: Tim Anderson
Mixers: Hilary Bercovici, David Bianco, Bobby Brooks, and Erik Zobler
Scratcher: D-Roc
Remixers: Dr. Freeze and Angela Piva
Timbales: Ronnie Gutierrez and Michael Sembello
Bongos: Alfred Ortiz
Congas: Alfred Ortiz
Photography: Barry King and Randee St. Nicholas

Charts

Weekly charts

Year-end charts

Certifications

References

1991 debut albums
Gerardo (musician) albums
Interscope Records albums